Luxury of Life is the debut album by the British pop group Five Star. Though not a great success when it was first released in the summer of 1985, the album eventually peaked at number 12 in early 1986, and spent a total of 70 weeks in the UK Albums Chart. It was certified Platinum in October 1986 for sales of over 300,000 copies in the UK. It also charted in the United States, peaking at number 57 on the Billboard 200 and 14 on the R&B Albums chart.

The album has a number of different contributors. Most of the tracks were produced either in Philadelphia by Nick Martinelli with members of Loose Ends or in London by Steve Harvey. Exceptions include the singles "Love Take Over", which was written and produced by the Dutch duo The Limit and mixed by Paul Hardcastle, and "System Addict", produced by its co-writer Billy Livsey.

Seven of the tracks were released as singles in the UK. Four became top 30 hit singles including the top 3 hit "System Addict". In the US, all three singles released made the R&B top 20 including "Let Me Be The One" which reached number 2.

Luxury of Life was re-released by Cherry Pop Records in November 2010 with bonus tracks.

Track listing
"Love Take Over" (Bernard Oattes, Rob van Schaik) – 3:57
"All Fall Down" (Barry Blue, Robin Smith) – 3:34
"Let Me Be The One" (Ian Foster) – 4:42
"System Addict" (Billy Livsey, Gary Bell) – 4:00
"Hide and Seek" (Gary Bell, Anne Dudley) – 5:30
"R.S.V.P." (Paul Gurvitz) – 4:37
"Now I'm in Control" (Mick Leeson, Peter Vale, Steve Jeffreys) – 3:42
"Say Goodbye" (Lorraine Pearson) – 4:14
"Crazy" (Gary Bell) – 3:57
"Winning" (Gary Bell) – 3:58

2010 CD reissue bonus tracks
"All Fall Down" (M&M remix)
"Let Me Be The One" (Philadelphia remix)
"Love Takes Over" (The Limit Edition mix) 
"R.S.V.P." (Urban remix)
"System Addict" (M&M remix) 
"Love Games" (B-side)

Charts

Weekly charts

Year-end charts

Certifications

References

1985 debut albums
Five Star albums
RCA Records albums